Flat spin may refer to:
 Flat spin, a boomerang-type motion in aviation
 FlatSpin, a 2001 play written by Alan Ayckbourn
 Flat spin, a skateboarding slide maneuver
 Flat spin, a freeskiing jump trick
 Flat spin (roller coaster element), a term used by Bolliger & Mabillard to describe a tight corkscrew